Quaternella is a genus of flowering plants in the amaranth family Amaranthaceae, endemic to Brazil. They are shrubs or subshrubs found mostly in the cerrado biome.

Species
Currently accepted species include:
Quaternella confusa Pedersen
Quaternella ephedroides Pedersen
Quaternella glabratoides (Suess.) Pedersen

References

Amaranthaceae
Amaranthaceae genera